This is a list of colleges and universities in metropolitan Boston. Some are located within Boston proper while some are located in neighboring cities and towns, but all are within the 128/95/1 loop. This is closer to the "inner core" definition of Metropolitan Boston, which excludes more suburban North Shore, South Shore and MetroWest regions. Although larger institutions may have several schools, some of which are located in cities other than that of the main campus (such as Harvard Medical School and Tufts University School of Medicine), each institution is listed only once and location is determined by the site of each institution's main campus.

There are a total of 44 institutions of higher education in the defined region, including six junior colleges, 11 colleges that primarily grant baccalaureate and master's degrees, eight research universities, and 19 special-focus institutions. Of these, 43 are non-profit organizations while one is a for-profit business, and 39 are private ventures while five are public institutions (four are run by the state of Massachusetts and one is operated by the city of Quincy).

In 2007, enrollment at these colleges and universities ranged from 108 students at the Episcopal Divinity School to 32,053 students at Boston University. The first to be founded was Harvard University, also the oldest institution of higher education in the United States, while the most recently established institution is the Urban College of Boston. All but two of these schools are accredited by the New England Association of Schools and Colleges (NEASC), the oldest regional accrediting body in the United States.

Institutions

See also 
 List of colleges and universities in Massachusetts for a full listing of the institutions of higher education in Massachusetts.
 Colleges of Worcester Consortium for Worcester-area colleges.

Explanatory notes

References 

Boston